Whitney Greenidge (born 6 May 1933) is a Barbadian cricketer who played four first-class matches for his national team between 1958 and 1961.

See also
 List of Barbadian representative cricketers

References

External links
 

1933 births
Living people
Barbadian cricketers
Barbados cricketers
People from Saint Michael, Barbados